Saraj is a village in the municipality of Bosilovo, North Macedonia. It is located near Strumica.

Demographics
According to the 2002 census, the village had a total of 937 inhabitants. Ethnic groups in the village include:

Macedonians 935
Serbs 2

References

See also
 Bosilovo Municipality
 Strumica
 Bosilovo

Villages in Bosilovo Municipality